Raymonde Gagné  (born January 7, 1956) is a Canadian politician and academic who was named to the Senate of Canada to represent Manitoba on March 18, 2016.

Prior to her appointment to the Senate, Gagné was a longtime faculty member and president of the Université de Saint-Boniface in Winnipeg. She was named a member of the Order of Canada in 2015.

On January 31, 2020, she was appointed Deputy to Representative of the Government in the Senate Marc Gold.

Honours and awards

In May 2014, Gagné was recognized with the Order of Manitoba

On November 20, 2014, Gagné was awarded the Order of Canada and was invested as a Member of the Order of Canada on September 23, 2015, for services to education and social services.

Gagné is also the recipient of the Queen's Diamond Jubilee Medal.

References

1957 births
Living people
Canadian senators from Manitoba
Independent Canadian senators
Women members of the Senate of Canada
Women in Manitoba politics
People from Saint Boniface, Winnipeg
Franco-Manitoban people
Members of the Order of Canada
Members of the Order of Manitoba
Canadian university and college chief executives
21st-century Canadian politicians
21st-century Canadian women politicians
Independent Senators Group
Women heads of universities and colleges